Tecumseh is an unincorporated community in Shawnee County, Kansas, United States, and situated along the Kansas River.  As of the 2020 census, the population of the community and nearby areas was 696.  The community and township are both named for the Shawnee chief.

History
By September 1, 1854, Thomas Stinson platted the townsite of Tecumseh, having settled in the area within the Kansas Territory. It was settled by pro-slavery partisans in the turbulent days of Bleeding Kansas. It temporarily served as the pro-southern capital of the territory and prospered, even having a newspaper. The town's post office opened in March 1855. After the Civil War, the town rapidly declined and remained so for the next ninety years.

Construction of the Kansas Power & Light Co. power plant in 1924 and 1925.  In 1958, DuPont established a cellophane plant east of town which created a minor boom.  As Topeka grew in the 1950s, Tecumseh again started to grow, this time as a suburb of Topeka, with numerous suburban housing subdivisions.

Geography
Tecumseh is located at  (39.0480558, -95.5791453), in Section 36, Township 11 south, Range 16 east.  It is situated south of the Kansas River between Tecumseh Creek to the east and Stinson Creek to the west.  Contained entirely within Tecumseh Township, it is about 2 miles east of the Topeka city limits. U.S. Route 40 passes the south side of Tecumseh. A BNSF rail line—running between Lawrence and Topeka—passes north of the town between it and the river.

Demographics

Tecumseh is part of the Topeka, Kansas Metropolitan Statistical Area.

For statistical purposes, the United States Census Bureau has defined this community as a census-designated place (CDP).

Economy
The community includes a public school (part of USD 450), two churches, a post office, a large electrical generating plant, and a cellophane factory.

Education
The community is served by Shawnee Heights USD 450 public school district.

References

Further reading

External links
 Shawnee County maps: Current, Historic, KDOT

Unincorporated communities in Shawnee County, Kansas
Unincorporated communities in Kansas
Topeka metropolitan area, Kansas